Anthony Stephen Harrington is a lawyer and former American ambassador to Brazil (1999–2001).  As of 2020, Harrington is Chair of Albright Stonebridge Group's (ASG) Managing Board and co-leads the firm's Americas practice.  He also served as CEO.  He is Chair of the Advisory Council of the Brazil Institute at the Woodrow Wilson Center.

Harrington was a longtime partner at Hogan & Hartson (now Hogan Lovells) in Washington, D.C.

Harrington was a Morehead Scholar at the University of North Carolina at Chapel Hill where he earned a B.A. and earned a J.D. from the Duke University School of Law Class of 1966.

References

Year of birth missing (living people)
Living people
Ambassadors of the United States to Brazil
American chief executives
American chairpersons of corporations
Lawyers from Washington, D.C.